is a Ryūkyūan gusuku on Izena Island. It was built around the 14th century by Samekawa, son of the Yogura Chief of Iheya Island. The castle has three sides which are near vertical cliffs; the south, west and east faces of the castle are rock cliffs, while the northern side provides entry to the castle through a series of steps cut into the hill. There are several chambers in the castle which are separated by walls, built with piled-up pieces of Ryūkyūan limestone,  in height. The chambers have many sacred relics such as utaki (holy enclosures of the Ryūkyūan religion) and also celadons, Sueki wares, and other important objects, which are also seen in other gusuku sites. King Shō Shin built Izena Tamaudun near the castle.

References

Castles in Okinawa Prefecture